Homedale High School is a public high school serving the community of Homedale, Idaho. It comprises grades 9-12 and had an approximate enrollment of 332 students for the 2008–09 academic year.

References

External links
School website
School district website

Public high schools in Idaho
Schools in Owyhee County, Idaho
Works Progress Administration in Idaho